Joachim Karlsson (born 13 January 1969) is a retired Swedish football striker.

References

1969 births
Living people
Swedish footballers
Örgryte IS players
IFK Luleå players
Trelleborgs FF players
Kalamata F.C. players
Association football forwards
Allsvenskan players
Swedish expatriate footballers
Expatriate footballers in Greece
Swedish expatriate sportspeople in Greece